The simple station Carrera 53 is part of the TransMilenio mass-transit system of Bogotá, Colombia, opened in the year 2000.

Location

The station is located in northwestern Bogotá, specifically on Calle 80 with Carrera 65.

It serves the Escuela de Cadetes (Cadets school) and Metropolis neighborhoods.

History

In 2000, phase one of the TransMilenio system was opened between Portal de la 80 and Tercer Milenio, including this station.

The station is named Carrera 53 for its location at the intersection of that road with Avenida Calle 80.

Station Services

Old trunk services

Main line service

Feeder routes

This station does not have connections to feeder routes.

Inter-city service

This station does not have inter-city service.

See also
Bogotá
TransMilenio
List of TransMilenio Stations

External links
TransMilenio

TransMilenio